Osei is both a surname and a given name. It is the fourth common surname in Ghana. Notable people with the name include:

Surname 

 Abena Osei Asare (born 1979), Ghanaian Politician

 Anthony Akoto Osei (born 1953), Ghanaian economist and Politician

 Charlotte Osei (born 1969), former Ghana Electoral Commissioner

Emmanuel Osei (born 1981), Ghanaian association football player
Emmanuel Osei Kuffour (born 1976), Ghanaian association football player
Eric Osei-Owusu (born 1963), Ghanaian Politician
Kennedy Osei (born 1966), Ghanaian middle distance runner
Kevin Osei (born 1991), French-born Ghanaian association football player
Kweku Osei (born 1990), Ghanaian professional association football player
Ransford Osei (born 1990), Ghanaian professional association football player
Michael Osei (born 1971),  Ghanaian professional association football player
Mikki Osei Berko, Ghanaian actor
Nana Osei Bonsu II (born 1939), Regent of the Ashanti Kingdom
Otumfuo Nana Osei Tutu II (born 1950), Asantehene
John Frimpong Osei (born 1971), Ghanaian Politician
Joseph Osei Owusu (born 1962), Ghanaian Politician

Given name 
Osei Bonsu (died 1824), Asantehene
Osei Kofi Tutu I (died 1717), founder of the Ashanti Confederacy
Osei Kwadwo, Ashanti king
Osei Kwame Panyin, Asantehene
Osei Telesford (born 1983) Trinidadian Footballer
Osei Kuffour Wiafe, (born 1986) lives and works in Brisbane, Australia

See also
Osei, alternative spelling of Osey, a variant of the Russian first name Avsey

References

Akan given names
Surnames of Akan origin